Yosypivka may refer to several places in Ukraine:

Yosypivka, Zakharivka Raion, Odessa Oblast 
Yosypivka, Zvenyachyn, Chernivtsi Oblast